Operator is a 2015 American action thriller drama film directed by Amariah Olson and Obin Olson and starring Luke Goss, Mischa Barton, Michael Paré and Ving Rhames.

Cast
Ving Rhames as Richard
Luke Goss as Jeremy Miller
Mischa Barton as Pamela Miller
Michael Paré as Howard
Tony Demil as Tony
Riley Bundick as Cassie
Maurice Chevalier as Officer Espinosa
Walter Hendrix III as Officer Stanton
Wendell Kinney as Officer Williams

Plot
Pamela Miller (Pam) is a married lady who lives separated from her Husband Jeremy Miller, who is a city police officer.
Pam works as a call center operator for 911 emergencies. They together have a daughter Cassie, whose custody is with Pam for the time being, till they are officially divorced. 
One day, a notorious criminal Richard (Ving Rhames) kidnaps Cassie and calls 911 only to connect with Pam, whom he wants to send her estranged husband, Jeremy the cop to certain locations, where he can be killed. Richard doesn't allow Pam to hang-up the call and answer other incoming emergency calls, leading to a physical conflict with a office coworker. 
Jeremy and his partner are able to figure out that someone is playing with them, after meeting a series of mishaps and accidents, and also receiving a text message from Pam, indicating that Cassie was kidnapped.

In the end, Jeremy is able to save Cassie and eliminate Richard.

References

External links
 
 

American action thriller films
American thriller drama films
American action drama films
2015 drama films
2015 films
Films scored by George Kallis
2010s English-language films
2010s American films